Mark Petersen-Perez is a watchdog of local governments in various cities in the greater San Francisco Bay region, political activist, financial analyst, and publisher of the online Palo Alto Free Press.

Petersen-Perez provoked the Police Chief of Palo Alto into appearing to admit to a policy of racial profiling, resulting in both widespread media coverage as well as activism in cities outside of Palo Alto, then he led a successful campaign leading to her resignation and change in police policy. Petersen-Perez is an outspoken opponent of police misconduct,  the police use of tasers, of racial discrimination, and is a local political advocate for the homeless. He has been described as "one of the most outspoken anti-taser activists".  

One story reported that just the mention of his name in a government meeting resulted in a shouting match and subsequent press coverage. When Petersen-Perez used the internet at his employers during his breaks to petition the government, the government repeatedly petitioned his private sector employers to terminate him, resulting in loss of employment in a chain of jobs. 
 
Front page image captions and news stories about Petersen-Perez have unusual characterizations of him ranging from "outspoken" and "fervent" to "maniacal". He is frequent speaker at Palo Alto City Council meetings. He is a financial analyst professionally, and analyses taser company finances as an activist.

Personal life

Petersen-Perez is a resident of Palo Alto and citizen of Nicaragua. He has worked with the Humane Society.

References

Year of birth missing (living people)
Living people